Renata Fast (born October 6, 1994) is a women's ice hockey player for the Toronto Furies of the Canadian Women's Hockey League. She was a member of the Clarkson Golden Knights squad that captured the 2014 National Collegiate women's ice hockey championship title. She made her debut with the Canada women's national ice hockey team at the 2015 4 Nations Cup, held from November 4–8 in Sundsvall, Sweden. She went on to represent the Canada women's national ice hockey team at the 2016 4 Nations Cup in Vierumäki, Finland, November 1–5. She competed in the 2017 Women's World Championships in Plymouth, Michigan, losing in overtime to the United States. She competed at the 2018 Winter Olympics, winning a silver medal.

Playing career

NCAA
In her second year (2013–2014), the Clarkson Golden Knights women's ice hockey team made history by winning their school's first NCAA Championship. In the process, the team also became the first team from outside the WCHA to win the women's National Collegiate national championship. In her senior year, she lived up to her surname by scoring the quickest goal in NCAA Tournament history, just 10 seconds in for the game-winner against Quinnipiac in the NCAA quarterfinal game.
Renata Fast served as an assistant captain in her Junior and Senior years. Recipient of Clarkson's Booster Club's Unsung Hero Award, which is presented to the player who always puts the team first and serves as an excellent role model to her teammates and the community.

Hockey Canada
Selected for Hockey Canada's National Women's Development Team 2014 and 2015 for the three-game series vs. the United States Women's Under-22 National Team, played during August in Calgary (2014) and Lake Placid (2015)
She was a member of Canada's National Women's Development Team that won a gold medal at the 2015 Nations Cup (formerly known as the Meco Cup).
She was a member of Canada's National Women's Development Team, which won a silver medal at the 2017 Nations Cup in Germany.

She made her debut with the Canada women's national ice hockey team at the 2015 4 Nations Cup, held from November 4–8 in Sundsvall, Sweden. Where they placed silver. She represented the Canada women's national ice hockey team at the same tournament in 2016, the 4 Nations Cup in Vierumäki, Finland, Nov. 1–5.

She competed in the 2017 IIHF Women's World Championship in Plymouth, Michigan, losing in overtime to the United States. She was selected for the 2017/2018 centralization roster in preparation for the 2018 Olympic Games to take place from February 9 to 25, 2018 in Pyeongchang County, South Korea. She was named to the 2018 Olympic Games Canada women's national ice hockey team competing in Pyeongchang County, South Korea where she wore . The Canada women's national ice hockey team earned a silver medal at the 2018 Olympic Games in a shootout.

On January 11, 2022, Fast was named to Canada's 2022 Olympic team.

CWHL
She was selected second overall by the Toronto Furies in the 2016 CWHL Draft.
 Fast's first season of play saw her appear in 22 of the Furies 24 games. She would put forth four goals and five assists in those games and finished the regular season as a plus five for plus/minus. Fast was a finalist for the CWHL's Rookie of the Year and was named a 2016–17 all star.

Personal Life 
She was born in Hamilton, Ontario and raised in Burlington, Ontario. Renata is the youngest of four siblings. 

Her siblings are Lindsey Fast (Sister), Christopher Fast (Brother), and Gregory Fast (Brother). 

Her parents are Sharon Fast (Mother) and Douglas Fast (Father).

Career Statistics 
Career statistics from Eliteprospects.com or The Internet Hockey Database.

Regular Season and Playoffs

International

Awards and honours

NCAA
2012–2016 – ECAC Hockey All-Academic team
2012/13 – Named twice to ECAC Hockey Weekly Honor Roll
2013/14 – Frozen Four All-Tournament team
2014/15 – First-Team ECAC Hockey All-Star
2015/16 – ECAC Hockey Weekly Honor Roll
2015/16 – Clarkson's Booster Club's Unsung Hero Award
2015/16 – Third-Team ECAC Hockey All-Star
2015/16 – Nominee for ECAC Hockey's Student-Athlete of the Year

CWHL
2016/17 – Finalist for CWHL Rookie of the Year
2016/17 – CWHL All-Star Team
2018/19 – CWHL All-Star Team

Burlington Sport Alliance
2017 – Female Athlete of the Year

IIHF
 2015 – Gold medal at the 2015 Nations Cup in FÜSSEN, Germany
 2015 – Silver medal at the 2015 4 Nations Cup in Sundsvall, Sweden
 2016 – Silver medal at the 2016 4 Nations Cup in Vierumäki, Finland
 2017 – Silver medal at the 2017 Nations Cup in FÜSSEN, Germany
 2017 – Silver medal at the 2017 IIHF Women's World Championships in Plymouth, Michigan

Olympics
 2018 – Silver medal at the 2018 Winter Olympics in Pyeongchang, South Korea
 2022 - Gold medal at the 2022 Winter Olympics in Beijing, China

References

External links
 
 
 
 
 

1994 births
Living people
Burlington Barracudas players
Canadian expatriate ice hockey players in the United States
Canadian women's ice hockey defencemen
Clarkson Golden Knights women's ice hockey players
Ice hockey people from Ontario
Ice hockey players at the 2018 Winter Olympics
Ice hockey players at the 2022 Winter Olympics
Medalists at the 2018 Winter Olympics
Medalists at the 2022 Winter Olympics
Olympic ice hockey players of Canada
Olympic medalists in ice hockey
Olympic gold medalists for Canada
Olympic silver medalists for Canada
Sportspeople from Hamilton, Ontario
Toronto Furies players
Professional Women's Hockey Players Association players
Family